Shanno Ki Shaadi is an Indian Hindi sitcom which aired on Star Plus from 7 August 2005 to 2006 on Sunday and later weekend nights.   It is based on the American film My Big Fat Greek Wedding. Produced by UTV Motion Pictures, it starred Divya Dutta and Vikas Bhalla. Initially aired on Sunday nights only, since December 2005, it became biweekly.

Initially it was planned for premiering on Star One and eight episodes were given to the channel. However it was decided to air the series on StarPlus.

Plot 
Set in the backdrop of Punjab, the series follows the journey of a 26 year old, simple and ordinary girl, Shanno, who is unmarried and loves to make Parathas in her father's Dhaba. She loses her interest in marriage on not finding a suitable groom for her while her family is keen for her marriage as soon as possible. Soon, she crosses paths with a NRI Sindhi man Arjun and they both fall in love after many confusions. They soon get married and their life goes on.

Cast 
 Divya Dutta as Shanno Mrs Arjun Sadarangani Shano ki Season 2
 Vikas Bhalla as Arjun Sadarangani
 Kulbhushan Kharbanda as Shantilal Halwai: Shanno's father
 Shoma Anand as Swaran: Shanno's mother
 Kamini Kaushal as Bebe: Shanno's grandmother
 Rajendra Mehra as Nanhelal
 Neelu Kohli as Kaanta: Shanno's aunt
 Shilpa Saklani as Shalu: Shanno's childhood friend
 Karan Veer Mehra as Kunnu
 Shagufta Ali as Mrs. Sadarangani: Arjun's mother
 Darshan Jariwala as Mr. Sadarangani: Arjun's father
 Harsh Vashisht
 Ravee Gupta

Reception
The Tribune stated, "Star’s shanno Ki Shaadi looks far less shambolic. We’re happy to see the ultra-gifted Divya Dutta back on the medium. She has a way of lighting up the medium. Most of the characters are true to life. And the sequences revolving around a Punjabi wedding add to the credibility of the sitcom."

Rediff stated, "The show's USP appears to be its simplicity and the way the audience can relate to the characters."

References

External links 
 Shanno Ki Shaadi on TVguide

StarPlus original programming
2005 Indian television series debuts
2006 Indian television series endings
UTV Television
Indian television sitcoms
Television shows set in Punjab, India